Bridge over Green River may refer to the following bridges:
ENP Bridge over Green River, near Daniel, Wyoming
ETD Bridge over Green River, near Fontenelle, Wyoming